Harry Antrim (August 27, 1884 – January 18, 1967) was an American stage, film and television actor.

Biography
Antrim was born on August 27, 1884, in Chicago, Illinois. By 1906, he was working in vaudeville. During the early 1930s, he moved to Los Angeles and secured largely uncredited parts in several films, beginning with 1936's Small Town Girl. As his career progressed, he landed roles in Miracle on 34th Street (1947), Larceny (1948) and The Luck of the Irish (1948). In Miracle on 34th Street, he played an ahistorical R.H. Macy in an uncredited role, owner of Macy's Department Store. Other notable appearances in his film career include Ma and Pa Kettle (1949), The Heiress (1949), Intruder in the Dust (1950), the Barbara Stanwyck-led No Man of Her Own (1950), Tomorrow is Another Day (1951), I'll See You in My Dreams (1951) and The Bounty Hunter (1954). Antrim's last film was The Monkey's Uncle (1965).

His television appearances include an episode of I Love Lucy as a shopkeeper, Fred Walker, owner of Walker's drug store in The Andy Griffith Show, Dennis the Menace and Green Acres among others.

Death
Antrim died of a heart attack on January 18, 1967, in Los Angeles, California.

He was buried at Valhalla Memorial Park Cemetery in North Hollywood, Los Angeles, California.

Partial filmography

Film

Television

References

External links

1884 births
1967 deaths
Male actors from Chicago
American male film actors
American male television actors
American male stage actors
Vaudeville performers
Burials at Valhalla Memorial Park Cemetery
20th-century American male actors